Carlisle Castle Hotel is a pub in Newtown, Sydney, New South Wales, Australia.

History
Carlisle Castle Hotel was built in 1876 as a classic pub hidden away in the back streets of Newtown.

The Italian marble bar that adorns the Castle’s traditional entrance nowadays was installed in the 1920s.

Carlisle Castle Hotel has gone through several renovations and iterations throughout the years.

Amenities
Carlisle Castle Hotel offers accommodation, a marble bar, piano parlor, lounge room, beer garden, and bottle shop.

There’s also a giant Jenga tower inside.

In popular culture
The pub was reportedly haunted. Bartenders have reported strange occurrences such as lights flickering on and off, beer taps turning on by themselves, and shadows moving around the room. In 2014, a wine bottle flinging off by itself was caught on camera.

Some suggested it must be “Old Peter” who worked in the pub in the early 1990s. Others suggest it's Carlisle Castle Hotel’s licensee, Peter Bradbury's, predecessor Johnny Hoy. Doubtful netizens however, insisted that the drinks fell off due to lazy shelf stacking or vibrations of a fridge motor.

See also
 List of public houses in Australia

References

External links 
Company website

Pubs in Sydney
1876 establishments in Australia
Hotel buildings completed in 1876
Newtown, New South Wales